Jordi Cortizo de la Piedra (born 30 June 1996) is a Mexican professional footballer who plays as a midfielder for Liga MX club Monterrey.

Career statistics

Club

References

External links

1996 births
Living people
Footballers from Querétaro
Association football midfielders
Mexican footballers
Querétaro F.C. footballers